was a Japanese video game development studio founded in June 1996 by Team Career, a team within the Masaya Games, which was formed to develop Langrisser and Langrisser II. Career Soft continued to work with Masaya Games for the development of Langrisser III, Langrisser IV and Langrisser V.

In October 2001, Atlus acquired Career Soft and became the sole publisher of their games. As a subsidiary to Atlus, Career Soft was in charge of develop the spiritual successor to the Langrisser franchise, Growlanser. In 2004, after the release of Growlanser IV, the majority of Career Soft's staff was merged into the main development team of Atlus, where they have worked on the Shin Megami Tensei sub-series Devil Survivor. Career Soft continued to exist as a label after Index Holdings dissolved Atlus into its video game business in October 2010.

On 5 September 2013, as a brand, Career Soft was dissolved once Sega acquired Index Corporation and transferred all the target company's assets into Sega Dream Corporation. On the 18 February 2014, the assets of Career Soft were transferred to the video game development division of Sega Dream Corporation which was re-branded as Atlus.

Games

References

Growlanser
Defunct video game companies of Japan
Video game companies established in 1996
Video game companies disestablished in 2013
Video game development companies